Connecticut United FC was a soccer team located in New Britain, Connecticut. The team, founded in 2015, played in the American Soccer League. The club's President was Greg Bajek.

References

Soccer clubs in Connecticut
2015 establishments in Connecticut
Association football clubs established in 2015
Sports in New Britain, Connecticut
American Soccer League (2014–2017) teams